Dindica sundae is a moth of the family Geometridae first described by Louis Beethoven Prout in 1935. It is found on Java and Bali.

References

Pseudoterpnini
Taxa named by Louis Beethoven Prout
Moths described in 1935